Michael Rive (born 1986) is an international lawn bowler representing Jersey.

Bowls career
Rive has represented Jersey at the Commonwealth Games in the singles at the 2010 Commonwealth Games.

In 2011, he won the pairs bronze medal at the Atlantic Bowls Championships with Malcolm De Sousa.

In 2022, he won the silver medal in the singles at the 2022 European Championships.

References 

Living people
1987 births
Jersey bowls players
Bowls players at the 2010 Commonwealth Games